The Proceedings of the Institution of Mechanical Engineers were first published by the Institution of Mechanical Engineers (IMechE) in 1847. The Proceedings were published under this single title until 1963, when they began to be published in two parts. The Proceedings have since expanded further, in part by incorporating four journals previously published separately: the Proceedings of the Institution of Automobile Engineers (in 1971), the Journal of the Institution of Locomotive Engineers (in 1971), the Journal of Mechanical Engineering Science (in 1983) and Engineering in Medicine (in 1989). Sixteen individual parts now make up the Proceedings, as follows:

Part A: Journal of Power and Energy
Part B: Journal of Engineering Manufacture
Part C: Journal of Mechanical Engineering Science
Part D: Journal of Automobile Engineering
Part E: Journal of Process Mechanical Engineering
Part F: Journal of Rail and Rapid Transit
Part G: Journal of Aerospace Engineering
Part H: Journal of Engineering in Medicine
Part I: Journal of Systems and Control Engineering
Part J: Journal of Engineering Tribology
Part K: Journal of Multi-body Dynamics
Part L: Journal of Materials: Design and Applications
Part M: Journal of Engineering for the Maritime Environment
Part N: Journal of Nanoengineering and Nanosystems
Part O: Journal of Risk and Reliability
Part P: Journal of Sports Engineering and Technology

In 2010, SAGE Publications began publishing the Institution's journals on behalf of the IMechE.

Abstracting and indexing 
As of May 2011, 14 of the journals that make up the Proceedings were included in the Journal Citation Reports.

References

External links 
 

Academic journals associated with learned and professional societies
Academic journal series
English-language journals
Engineering journals
Institution of Mechanical Engineers academic journals
Publications established in 1847
SAGE Publishing academic journals
1847 establishments in England